Darius Jermaine Butler (born March 18, 1986) is a former American football free safety. He played college football at Connecticut. Butler was drafted by the New England Patriots in the second round of the 2009 NFL Draft. He has also played for the Carolina Panthers and Indianapolis Colts. Butler began his career as a cornerback and switched to safety in 2016.

Early years
Butler was born in Frankfurt, Germany and lived there for three years while his father was stationed there with the US Military. Butler attended Coral Springs Charter School in Coral Springs, Florida. While there he played quarterback and safety. In addition to football, Butler also ran track and played basketball, scoring over 1,000 points during his career. He was an All-County selection as well as an All-State honorable mention.

College career
Butler played college football at the University of Connecticut, where he was a four-year starter and two-year team captain. He was primarily a cornerback, but he also spent time as a kickoff returner and wide receiver.

Butler was twice named Big East Player of the Week, both during his freshman year in 2005. He earned Big East Defensive Player of the Week after intercepting three passes for 122 interception return yards and a touchdown in a game against Army on October 1, 2005. The 122 return yards set both a Connecticut and Michie Stadium record. He also was awarded Big East Special Teams Player of the Week after he returned a kick off 90 yards for a touchdown against South Florida on November 26, 2005. After his senior season in 2008, Butler was named to the All-Big East first-team, despite not having a single interception all season.

Butler finished his career at Connecticut starting 43 of 45 games, recording 180 tackles, 10 interceptions for 213 return yards and two touchdowns. He also scored three other touchdowns: one on a kickoff return, one rushing, and one receiving.

Professional career

New England Patriots
Butler was drafted by the New England Patriots in the second round (41st overall) of the 2009 NFL Draft.  On July 10, 2009, he signed a four-year contract with the Patriots that included a total of about $2.1 million in guaranteed money.

Butler got his first career start and interception against the Tennessee Titans. The following week, he got his second interception against the Tampa Bay Buccaneers. He returned an interception 91 yards for a touchdown against the Houston Texans on January 3, 2010. He finished the season starting five of 14 games played, recording three interceptions, 35 tackles, and eight passes deflected.

In 2010, Butler started the first two games of the season, including a Patriots loss to the New York Jets in Week 2. In the game, Butler gave up a touchdown reception and was also penalized twice for defensive pass interference on another Jets touchdown drive. He was replaced as a starter by Kyle Arrington the next week, and was not part of the team's defensive sub packages. After being a healthy inactive for the team's Week 10 game against the Pittsburgh Steelers, Butler returned to make his third start of the season, as the Patriots' nickel cornerback for their Week 13 win over the Jets. Butler finished the season with three starts in 15 games played, recording 23 tackles and six pass deflections.

On September 6, 2011, he was waived by New England.

Carolina Panthers
Butler was claimed off waivers by the Carolina Panthers on September 6, 2011. He would appear in 13 games for the Panthers, starting in 6 of them.

On August 31, 2012, Butler was waived by the Panthers.

Indianapolis Colts
Butler was signed as a free agent by the Indianapolis Colts on September 25, 2012.

On March 12, 2013, he was re-signed to a two-year contract. Butler signed a new contract extension worth $5 million over two years with the Colts on March 8, 2015. He was named the AFC Defensive Player of the Week for Week 9 of the 2015 NFL season, after recording two tackles, one interception, and one pass defensed in the Colts 27–24 win over the Denver Broncos.

Butler switched to safety in 2016, but reverted to cornerback during the season as injuries mounted for the Colts. He then chose to move back to safety in 2017.

On March 17, 2017, Butler re-signed with the Colts on a one-year deal worth $3 million. He played in 15 games with four starts at free safety for the Colts in 2017.

Personal life
Butler is cousins with Willis McGahee, former Cincinnati Bengals defensive tackle Geno Atkins, and Green Bay Packers inside linebacker Randy Ramsey. 

Butler is a reoccurring guest on “The Pat McAfee Show”, and hosts his own podcast “The Man to Man” alongside Antoine Bethea.

Butler is the voice of the offensive coordinator in the virtual reality video game “NFL Pro Era”

In 2022 Butler joined NFL Matchup.

References

External links

Indianapolis Colts bio
New England Patriots bio
Connecticut Huskies bio 

1986 births
Living people
Sportspeople from Coral Springs, Florida
Players of American football from Fort Lauderdale, Florida
American football cornerbacks
American football safeties
UConn Huskies football players
New England Patriots players
Carolina Panthers players
Indianapolis Colts players